Guiyang County is a county in Hunan Province, China, it is under the administration of Chenzhou prefecture-level City.

Located on the southern part of the province, it is adjacent to the east of the city proper in Chenzhou. The county is bordered to the north by Changning and Leiyang Cities, to the west by Xintian and Jiahe Counties, to the south by Linwu County, to the east by Suxian and Beihu Districts. The county has 17 towns, three subdistricts and two townships under its jurisdiction, the county seat is Longtan Subdistrict.

Administrative divisions
3 subdistricts 
 Huangshaping
 Longtan
 Lufeng

17 towns
 Aoquan
 Chonglingjiang
 Fangyuan
 Haotang
 Heping
 Heye
 Leiping
 Liantang
 Liufeng
 Ouyanghai
 Renyi
 Sili
 Taihe
 Tangshi
 Yangshi
 Zhangshi
 Zhenghe

1 townships
 Qiaoshi

1 ethnic township
 Yao Baishui

Climate

Notable people

 Liu Fangwu (1898–1994), a Nationalist (KMT) general, a graduate of Whampoa Military Academy, best known for his leadership in the Battle of Yenangyaung.

References

 
County-level divisions of Hunan
Geography of Chenzhou